Uwe Boll (born June 22, 1965) is a German filmmaker. He came to prominence during the 2000s for his adaptations of video game franchises. Released theatrically, the films were critical and commercial failures; his 2005 Alone in the Dark adaptation is considered one of the worst films ever made. Boll's films during the 2010s, comprising mostly original projects and independent movies, received home media releases to better, although still mostly negative reviews. After retiring in 2016 to become a restaurateur, Boll announced his return to filmmaking in 2020. His films are financed through his production companies Boll KG and Event Film Productions.

Early life
Boll was born in Wermelskirchen and studied at the University of Cologne. He holds a PhD in literature; in 1994, he published a dissertation (doctorate thesis) at the University of Siegen.

Boll first decided to go into the movie business at ten years old after seeing Marlon Brando's Mutiny on the Bounty.

Career

Films

Boll's first two major releases were the horror movie Blackwoods and the drama Heart of America, both of which he directed and co-wrote.

He achieved recognition for loosely adapting video games into movies, having directed and produced a number of such adaptations, including House of the Dead, Alone in the Dark, Alone in the Dark II, BloodRayne, BloodRayne 2: Deliverance, BloodRayne: The Third Reich, In the Name of the King, In the Name of the King 2: Two Worlds, In the Name of the King 3: The Last Mission, Postal, and Far Cry.

In the opening credits to Seed (2007), Boll used footage of animal abuse and torture he acquired from PETA to underscore the film's nihilism. He has also promised to donate 2.5 percent of his net profits from Seed to PETA.

In September 2010, a trailer for Boll's film, titled Auschwitz, about the concentration camp, was posted on YouTube. The trailer, in which Boll appears as an SS gas chamber guard, contains explicit scenes of the brutalization and killing of concentration camp inmates. Boll has been quoted as saying that films such as Schindler's List "no longer had the ability to reach young people and that it was his duty as a German to make the film as a way of confronting the past."

In 2010 Boll was the subject of a documentary film titled Raging Boll, directed by Dan West, which premiered at the Austin Film Festival in October 2010.

In March 2012, it was announced he had finished directing a short horror story for the anthology film The Profane Exhibit. The story, inspired by Josef Fritzl, focuses on parents with a daughter locked in a room, where they can partake in immoral acts against her.

Boll planned a fourth entry in the BloodRayne franchise in a contemporary setting involving her trying to live a normal life. Natassia Malthe was expected to return, and was expected to be loosely based on the video game BloodRayne 2.

In August 2013, Boll announced plans to produce a sequel to Postal based on achieving $500,000 from a Kickstarter campaign. The campaign was however cancelled on 5 October 2013.

In October 2016, during an interview with the Toronto edition of Metro, Boll announced his retirement from filmmaking, chiefly citing the decline of DVD and Blu-ray sales, noting that he has had to use his own money to finance his work since 2005.

As of 2017, he still works as a film producer. In February 2018, he revealed in his vlog that he intends to return to film and has sent proposals to Netflix. However, he no longer wants to finance his projects.

In November 2018, Boll was the subject of a second documentary film titled Fuck You All: The Uwe Boll Story, directed by Sean Patrick Shaul and produced by Prairie Coast Films, which premiered at the 2018 Whistler Film Festival.

In October 2020, Boll decided to return to making films and announced Germany in Winter as his next project in development.

Financing
Boll's films have often performed poorly at the box office in the United States and around the world. House of the Dead, which was budgeted at $12 million, made $5.73 million in its opening weekend, Alone in the Dark, which was budgeted at $20 million, made $5.1 million, and BloodRayne, which was made for $25 million, made $2.42 million. 

Boll was criticized in 2005 regarding his funding method, attributed to a loophole in the German tax laws that was finally closed in 2006.

Writings
Boll has written two books, Wie man in Deutschland einen Film drehen muss (How one must make a movie in Germany) and Die Gattung Serie und ihre Genres (Genus Series and its Genres), on themes of serial television.

Reception and reputation

As of April 2015, House of the Dead (for which VideoHound's "Golden Movie Retriever" described Boll as a "cinematic train wreck") and Alone in the Dark appear on IMDb's "Bottom 100" film list. In a review of Alone in the Dark, Rob Vaux states that the movie makes other "bad" movie directors feel better in comparison: "'It's okay,' they'll tell themselves, 'I didn't make Alone in the Dark.'" Another reviewer wrote that Alone in the Dark was "so poorly built, so horribly acted and so sloppily stitched together that it's not even at the straight-to-DVD level." One critic has dubbed him as the "Jonas Brothers of movie directors".

After Boll was linked to a potential film adaptation of the Metal Gear franchise, series creator Hideo Kojima responded, "It's impossible that we'd ever do a movie with him." Boll also made a bid to direct the 2016 Warcraft movie, but was turned away by the owners of the Warcraft franchise, Blizzard Entertainment, who said: "We will not sell the movie rights, not to you…especially not to you." Boll commented: "Because it's such a big online game success, maybe a bad movie would destroy that ongoing income, what the company has with it."

Blair Erickson, a writer of a treatment for Alone in the Dark, has written a critical account of his experience working with Boll, in which Erickson alleges that Boll stole ideas from prior movies and wanted to add elements to the story that were not true to the tone of the source material. Boll chose to not use Erickson's script, citing reasons such as it having "not enough car chases."

Boll has blamed the poor theatrical performance of his early video game adaptations on his distribution company, Romar, and has filed a lawsuit against them. Boll's films prior to the release of House of the Dead were more positively received. The New York Times, for instance, gave Blackwoods a positive review, although most reactions to the film have been negative.

Boll received a rare "Worst Career Achievement" award at the 29th Golden Raspberry Awards on 21 February 2009 for In the Name of the King, 1968 Tunnel Rats, and Postal. He has been nominated for Razzies three times in total.

In September 2010, Darfur won the New York International Independent Film and Video Festival prize for the best international film.

Response to criticism
In the Alone in the Dark DVD commentary, he responds to criticism that his adaptations make significant changes to the plot and style of the source material: "Fans are always totally flipping out and I understand that the fan of a video game has his own agenda in his head and has his ideas about what is a good movie and what is a bad movie." Referring to House of the Dead, Boll said: "I think I made a perfect House of the Dead movie, because it really shows how the game is. It's a lot of fun, it's over-the-top action." Boll is especially critical of his Internet detractors. Referring to two Ain't It Cool News critics who negatively reviewed his work, Boll said, "Harry (Knowles) and Quint (Eric Vespe) are retards." Boll later claimed Knowles was being "played" by film studios that "kissed his ass" with set visits and pretend offers to produce large-budget films and suggested to Knowles the reason he did not like him was because, "I never kissed your ass, Harry."

Boll also criticizes the game companies themselves for not providing support to the production following the selling of the film rights. He cites the cross-promotion and support that comic book-based properties adapted for the screen receive, whereas video game companies often "sell off the license and then forget about it." He argues that this is the reason video game adaptations are not well received by critics and audiences.

When Wired published a negative review of Postal, Boll responded with an email claiming that the critic didn't "understand anything about movies and that you are an untalented wannabe filmmaker with no balls and no understanding what POSTAL is. You don't see courage because you are nothing. and no go to your mom and fuck her ...because she cooks for you now since 30 years ..so she deserves it" . Boll stated that this angry email was sparked not by the review, but because the Wired editor told Boll in person that they loved the movie and then published a negative review.

Critic boxing matches – "Raging Boll"
Boll made headlines by challenging his critics to "put up or shut up". In June 2006, his production company issued a press release stating that Boll would challenge his five harshest critics each to a 10-round boxing match. Invitations were also open to film directors Quentin Tarantino and Roger Avary. To qualify, critics had to have written two extremely negative reviews of Boll, in print or on the Web. In 2005, footage from the fights were to be included on the DVD of his upcoming film Postal. On 20 June 2006, Rich "Lowtax" Kyanka stated on Something Awful that he had been invited by Boll to be the first contestant, after Kyanka reviewed Alone in the Dark. The online gambling site GoldenPalace.com decided to sponsor this event, dubbing it "Raging Boll" (a play on the 1980 Martin Scorsese film Raging Bull). A lot was drawn up in late August 2006, featuring Kyanka, Rue Morgue magazine writer Chris Alexander, webmaster of Cinecutre Carlos Palencia Jimenez-Arguello, Ain't it Cool News writer Jeff Sneider, and Chance Minter, amateur boxer and website critic. Boll fought and won against all five participants. The first match took place on 5 September 2006 in Estepona, Spain, against Carlos Palencia. The others battled on 23 September 2006, at the Plaza of Nations in Vancouver, Canada.

After Kyanka lost his match, he would go on to make several allegations against Boll, including a claim that Boll refused to fight against Chance Minter who was an experienced amateur boxer. However, Boll fought Minter as his fourth opponent. He also alleged that Boll had misled them by claiming that it was a PR stunt when he actually intended to fight them, and that Boll stated that the participants would get training before the match, which none did.

Kyanka added in a post-match interview that, "Half of us (the contenders) hadn't even seen his movies." Sneider shared similar sentiments, stating "I think he's a jerk. This might be PR but I don't want to keep getting punched in the head." Boll has denied these claims in an interview, stating that he gave his opponents three months to prepare.

Other contestants responded less negatively. Alexander, in a Toronto Star article, recounts being invited to Boll's beach house on the following day, where Boll asked him about the reasons for his negative reviews. Alexander bluntly told Boll that his movies were "bloated, expensive and incoherent attempts at aping American genre pictures, sporting some of the most boneheaded casting choices in filmdom". He also stated that Boll was an "insane, two-fisted rogue, and a shockingly honest one at that, someone who absolutely adores film, knows its history and truly lives for what he does."

Alexander referred to the event as "the weirdest pop culture bizarre journalism stunt I've ever been involved in." Minter also praised what he had seen of Boll's upcoming production known as Seed. Boll praised the contestants in a post fight press conference, stating "I now like the critics... Everybody who was in the ring showed guts. Nobody dived."

Electronic Gaming Monthly's November 2006 edition's "The Rest of the Crap" section, written by critic Seanbaby, described Seanbaby's own involvement. Boll was going to appear on G4's Attack of the Show! to promote this fight by sparring with one of the hosts. Seanbaby stated that, "Again, he's a matchmaking genius, because everyone on TV is three feet tall. If you were watching Attack of the Show during the time I cohosted, you might have noticed that I could have leaned over and eaten host Kevin Pereira." A producer of the show then asked if Seanbaby would come and spar in the host's place for the event. Seanbaby said that he trains in muay thai and Brazilian jiu-jitsu, stating that "boxing is to fighting what Hungry Hungry Hippos is to fighting", but that he was eager to fight Boll nonetheless. When Boll heard of this, he wanted to know Seanbaby's age, height, weight and fighting experience since he "learned he wasn't fighting a midget." Seanbaby stated he sent said information to Boll, after which Boll chose not to appear on the program. Boll similarly declined to fight Canadian comedian Ron Sparks.

Petition to retire
In April 2008, The Guardian ran an article claiming Boll had promised to retire if an online petition at PetitionOnline.com asking him to do so received 1,000,000 signatures. A petition was later started on the site in response, with the 1,000,000 signature goal.

On 7 May 2008, the makers of Stride gum announced they would give each signer a digital coupon for a pack of gum if the petition obtained the required 1 million signatures by 14 May  2008. This deadline ultimately passed without the petition reaching 1 million signatures.

In a later interview with Mike Gencarelli of the Movie Mikes website on 22 March 2010, Boll stated that he would not retire if the petition received one million signatures, commenting:

"I think no, it has been too long. If they would have made it to a million in like two months, then they would have had something. They even got sponsored by that gum factory. I felt like it's three years later, forget it. I also felt that people signed numerous times on the petition so it is probably only like 150,000 people that actually signed it."

The petition itself failed to reach one million signatures by the time PetitionOnline shut down on 30 September 2014, peaking at about 353,835 signatures.

Response
As part of a publicity stunt for Postal, Boll released a video claiming that he is "the only genius in the whole fucking [movie] business" and that other directors such as Michael Bay and Eli Roth are "fucking retards". He promised that his film Postal would be "way better than all that social-critic George Clooney bullshit that you get every fucking weekend". In response to an "Anti-Uwe Boll" online petition, Boll has also expressed hopes that somebody will start a Pro-Uwe Boll petition, which he would expect to hit a million signatures. As of 22 July 2012, the pro-Uwe Boll petition with the most signatures is the Long Live Uwe Boll poll with a total of 7,631 signatures.

Bay responded to the "fucking retards" comment by calling Boll "a sad being" and stated that he did not care "in the slightest" about the remark, while Roth facetiously described Boll's comments as the "greatest compliment ever". Boll later noted that the comments were meant to paint a generic picture over Hollywood, and that he has nothing against the people mentioned.

Boll then appeared on Thursday, 10 April's episode of G4's Attack of the Show, where he was interviewed in the nude regarding his controversial online retort. In the interview, he said (in regard to Michael Bay and Eli Roth responding to his criticisms) that Roth "has a sense of humor" and that Bay "has no sense of humor". He also jokingly stated that he believes that his upcoming adaptation of Postal (from the video game of the same name) could beat Indiana Jones and the Kingdom of the Crystal Skull at the box office.

On 27 April 2008, Boll responded to Bay's "not caring about Boll" comment. "To prove who is the better director", Boll offered to challenge Bay to a boxing match at Mandalay Bay in Las Vegas. If Bay accepted, the match would last for 12 rounds and would take place in September. In response to Boll's offer, Bay again posted a statement, this time saying:

"I never even heard his name till last week when he made threats and rants. The guy is a fucking idiot, making threats to me, Clooney, Eli Roth, says he has a doctorate—but uses the word "retard" in his vocabulary, come on. When you look at his videos, what is interesting are the backgrounds. I guess his low rent offices, with 15 year old 3/4 machines, archaic computers, this is just some dumb chump trying to get some fame when he has none, so he has to make YouTube lame quality anger rants. This guy just wants attention because he can't get any for the so called movies he makes. Nothing sadder when he had his screening in LA to an over half empty movie house." 

On 7 June 2015, Boll released a video on his YouTube account titled "fuck you all", targeting those who did not fund his last film, then tentatively titled Rampage 3, on Kickstarter as he was unable to secure enough funds. The video quickly became popular and has over 1.9 million views as of June 2021.

On 20 October 2016, in an interview with the Toronto, Canada edition of Metro, Boll announced that Rampage: President Down, released a month earlier in September 2016, was his last film, citing market failures and funding difficulties. In the film's final credits, Boll can be seen tipping his hat and walking away from the camera.

Restaurants
Following his retirement from filmmaking, Boll entered the restaurant industry. His desire to become a restaurateur came from his own love of fine dining. He claims to have visited 120 Michelin-starred restaurants within a span of 10 years, and has made a short video series of restaurant reviews.

In 2015, Boll opened the Bauhaus Restaurant in Vancouver, after noting a lack of German cuisine in the city. He hired Stefan Hartmann as executive chef, who earned a Michelin star for his own Hartmanns Restaurant in Berlin. Hartmann resigned from Bauhaus in April 2017, to be replaced by chefs David Mueller and Tim Schulte.

Bauhaus has received overall positive reviews from local and international food critics. The restaurant ranked 37th on the 2016 list of Canada's 100 Best Restaurants. It is also listed in The World's 50 Best Restaurants Discovery Series in 2017, being one of only three Canadian restaurants to be included.

Boll has remarked about his newfound success in owning a restaurant: "It's interesting, right? I had to open up a restaurant to get good reviews."

In early 2018, Boll and his wife Natalie formed the Bauhaus Group to expand business. The group acquired the Blenheim Pub in Vancouver, changing it from a sports bar to a family-oriented restaurant. The restaurant has since closed. They also announced plans to open a second Bauhaus Restaurant location in Toronto in early 2019. A third location in China is also planned, to be opened in the Ocean Flower Island artificial archipelago and led by two European Michelin-starred chefs.

Personal life
Boll previously lived in Richmond Hill, Ontario. He currently lives in Vancouver, British Columbia. Despite having lived in Canada for many years, he still retains his German citizenship. He married Canadian film producer Natalia Tudge in 2014. Together, they have a son and a stepson.

Filmography

Film

Music videos

References

External links 

Golden Palace Events – Photos, video, and details of Uwe's September 2006 boxing match with his critics

1965 births
English-language film directors
Film directors from Vancouver
Film people from North Rhine-Westphalia
German emigrants to Canada
German restaurateurs
Horror film directors
Living people
Naturalized citizens of Canada
People from the Rhine Province
University of Cologne alumni
University of Siegen alumni